Derek William Wood (born 12 November 1959) is a Scottish retired football right winger and forward who made over 140 appearances in the Scottish League for Queen's Park. He also played for Albion Rovers, Clyde and East Stirlingshire.

References

Scottish footballers
Scottish Football League players
Queen's Park F.C. players
Association football wingers
1959 births
Footballers from Glasgow
Association football forwards
Clyde F.C. players
East Stirlingshire F.C. players
Albion Rovers F.C. players
Living people